That Winter, the Wind Blows is a 2013 South Korean romantic melodrama television series starring Jo In-sung and Song Hye-kyo. A gambler and con man (Jo) pretends to be the long-lost brother of a blind heiress (Song), but these two damaged people come to find the true meaning of love after getting to know each other.

The series is based on the Japanese drama  that aired on TBS in 2002 and was previously adapted into the 2006 Korean film Love Me Not. This 2013 Korean drama adaptation was written by Noh Hee-kyung and directed by Kim Kyu-tae.

It premiered on SBS with two back-to-back episodes on February 13, 2013. The series continued airing on Wednesdays and Thursdays at 21:55 for 16 episodes, ending on April 3, 2013.

Synopsis
A melodrama about a man and a blind woman who doesn't believe in love. Oh Soo is an orphan who is left heartbroken after his first love dies. He leads a life as a high-stakes gambler.  Oh Young is a lonely visually-impaired heiress whose parents are dead. She has a younger estranged brother. She inherited her parents' wealth. Oh Soo pretends to be Oh Young's brother in order to inherit her wealth when she dies. However, the two soon learn the true meaning of love.

Cast
Jo In-sung as Oh Soo 
An orphan who doesn't care about anything after the death of his first love, he becomes a high-class gambler and playboy. Desperate to find money to repay a debt or forfeit his own life, he becomes a con artist who sets sights on a new target: Oh Young, pretending to be her long-lost brother.

Song Hye-kyo as Oh Young 
A legally blind heiress of a conglomerate. Oh Young lives alone, estranged from her mother and older brother since she was a child.

Kim Bum as Park Jin-sung 
Soo's best friend and right-hand man. Loyal and hot-headed, Jin-sung dreams of scraping up enough money to buy his father an organic cattle farm.

Jung Eun-ji as Moon Hee-sun 
Younger sister of Soo's first love, Hee-joo. Hee-sun is a quirky, tomboyish girl with a deep fondness for flowers. Though Hee-sun tries to despise Soo after he leaves Hee-joo, she finds that she cannot, and instead helps him in his scheme.

Bae Jong-ok as Wang Hye-ji 
Officially a secretary, she runs the company and is Young's caretaker.
Kim Tae-woo as Jo Moo-chul 
A gangster, with past ties to Soo, Jin-sung, and Hee-sun.
Kim Kyu-chul as Jang Sung 
Family lawyer of the Oh's.
Kim Young-hoon as Lee Myung
Oh Young's fiancé.
Im Se-mi as Son Mi-ra 
Young's friend who works at a coffee shop.
Choi Seung-kyung as Shim Joong-tae
Han Jung-hyun as Kim Jung-hyun
Jung Kyung-soon as Jo Sun-hee 
A doctor, and Moo-chul's estranged older sister.
Kim Jong-hyun as gangster
Go In-beom as Jin-sung's father
Seo Hyo-rim as Jin So-ra 
Soo's ex-girlfriend and mistress of a gang boss. She steals the boss's money, a crime which Soo is framed for.
Lee Jae-woo as Oh Soo 
Young's older brother, who died in a car accident.
Kyung Soo-jin as Moon Hee-joo 
Soo's first love who was pregnant with his child and dies in a motorcycle accident.
Yoo Gun as Jung-woo 
Young's first love.

Production

Casting
Writer Noh Hee-kyung and director Kim Kyu-tae had previously collaborated with Song Hye-kyo on the 2008 series Worlds Within. Kim Bum had also worked with Noh and Kim on the 2011 series Padam Padam... The Sound of His and Her Heartbeats. Jung Eun-ji was the last major casting to be announced; this is her second TV series after the popular Reply 1997.

This marked Jo In-sung's first television series in eight years since Spring Day in 2005, as well as his first acting project since being discharged from mandatory military service. Jo said, "When I first decided to do it, I saw the script and felt it was worth a go. But the more I read it, the more I felt that if I didn't do it right, it would be a total disaster," further explaining that there was a "huge gap between reading the script and acting it out."

Song said about her role as a blind woman, "Because my character cannot see, I am unable to make eye contact with In-sung and can only see how it plays out when I monitor the scenes afterwards. I must rely on his voice and his voice carries enough emotional weight for it to work." Regarding criticism about her characterization, she said, "Many asked why blind people would wear high heels and makeup, even eyeliner. But when I visited facilities for the blind and asked them, they told me that they also wear makeup and colorful clothing."

The four leads attended the drama press conference held on January 31, 2013.

Filming
On February 4, 2013, Jo cut his hand while filming a scene in Icheon, Gyeonggi Province, where he had to punch a wall in anger, after the glass frame broke on impact. He received 13 stitches for his wound at a nearby hospital, then returned to the set and finished shooting.

When the production filmed on location at Yongpyong Ski Resort in Daegwallyeong-myeon, Pyeongchang, Gangwon Province, fashion magazine High Cut was invited along the shoot for three days and two nights. The feature appeared on the cover of High Cuts March 2013 edition (or Issue 97).

Director Kim Kyu-tae utilized a lot of ultra close-up shots, to highlight the characters' emotions and accentuate the smallest movement in the actors' faces or expression in their eyes. Cinematographer and visual director Kim Cheon-seok said such visual techniques differentiated the show from the standard set by existing Korean dramas, which usually resort to medium shots or bust shots. To produce such detailed shots, the crew used expensive high-definition ALEXA Plus cameras, known for their rich color and high-speed cinematography. Lighting director Park Hwan also employed twice as much lighting equipment as do other dramas. Another technique the crew used was post-production correction, which was possible because when the first episode aired, eight were already taped. Park said, "It's both my and Kim's philosophy that the actress should look beautiful even when she is wailing."

Among the product placements (PPL) in the series were Laneige cosmetics (featured in episode 4 when the character Oh Young gets a makeover at a Laneige store before her high school reunion; Song has been the brand's endorser for six years), tuxedo maker Parkland, and Hyundai Motor Company. Viewers have complained on the drama's website about the overuse of PPL.

Locations
Oh Young's mansion was filmed at the arboretum Jade Garden in Gangwon Province (Full House Take 2 and Love Rain were also shot there), and her flower garden was filmed at the Hantaek Botanical Garden in Yongin, Gyeonggi Province. The various scenes set in a coffee shop were shot at the Nonhyeon-dong and Cheongdam-dong branches of coffee shop franchise De Chocolate Coffee in Gangnam District, Seoul.

Original soundtrack

Part 1

Part 2

Part 3

Part 4

Part 5

Reception
According to AGB Nielsen Media Research, the premiere episode achieved a nationwide rating of 11.3 percent in viewership, ranked third behind Iris II on KBS and 7th Grade Civil Servant on MBC. The second back-to-back episode rose 1.5 percent to 12.8 percent. By the third episode the series was ranked first along with Iris II at 12.4 percent, then both episodes the following week were ranked first in their timeslot. In its third week, That Winter, the Wind Blows remained on top, while its two rival series competed for second place with small differences in viewership rating. According to TNmS, the series continued to rank number one in its timeslot for the remainder of its broadcast, though quoting slightly different figures. The series finale maintained its first-place ranking and recorded its highest rating with a viewership of 15.4 and 15.8 percent nationwide, and an average of 19.1 and 18.2 percent in the Seoul National Capital Area, according to TNmS and AGB Nielsen respectively.

In the media
Scenes from the drama were parodied by sketch comedy show Saturday Night Live Korea on cable channel tvN. On the episode broadcast on March 9, 2013, hosts Lee Young-ja and Shin Dong-yup, in the roles of Oh Young and Oh Soo, respectively, performed a 19+ skit in the SNLK style, including a parody of the cotton candy kiss. The series also been parodied in SBS's own Running Man

In March 2013, Song sponsored the cost of publication of guidebooks for the blind at the Independence Hall of Korea in Cheonan, South Chungcheong Province. The project was organized by Seo Kyoung-duk, a professor at Sungshin Women's University, after learning that braille brochures were unavailable at the site and other local museums despite the large number of visually impaired visitors. Song joined the effort at Seo's suggestion in November 2012, noting that her role as a blind woman helped her better understand the daily challenges faced by people with disabilities.

Awards and nominations

References

External links 
 

2013 South Korean television series debuts
2013 South Korean television series endings
Seoul Broadcasting System television dramas
Korean-language television shows
South Korean television series based on Japanese television series
South Korean romance television series
South Korean melodrama television series
Television shows written by Noh Hee-kyung
Ai Nante Irane Yo, Natsu